The Filmfare Best Documentary Award was one of the Filmfare Awards, given by the magazine Filmfare to documentary films. It was first presented in 1967, and was eliminated in 1998.

Winners and nominees

1960s
 1967 Handicrafts of Rajasthan – Clement T. Baptista
 1968 India '67 – S. Sukhdev
 1969 Explorer – Promod Pati

1970s
 1970 Then, The Rain – Ramesh Gupta
 1971 Koodal – Mushir Ahmed
 1972 Creations in Metal – Homi D. Sethna
 1973 Nine Months to Freedom – S. Sukhdev
 1974 A Day with the Builders – C.J. Paulose
 1975 The Nomad Puppeteer – Mani Kaul
 1976 Sarojini Naidu – B.D. Garga
 1977 Marvel of Memory – N.K. Issar
 1978 Transformations – Zafar Hai
 1979 no award

1980s
 1980 Malfunction – Pankaj Parashar
 1981 They Call Me Chamar – Lokesh Lalvani
 1982 Faces After the Storm – Prakash Jha
 1983 Experience India – Zafar Hai
 1984 Veer Savarkar – Prem Vaidya
 1985 Charakku – Om Prakash Sharma
 1986 Bombay: Our City – Anand Patwardhan
 1987 no award
 1988 no award
 1989 no award

1990s
 1990 Siddeshwari – Mani Kaul
 1991 Amjad Ali Khan – Gulzar
 1992 Ram ke Naam – Anand Patwardhan
 1993 All in the Family – Ketan Mehta
 1994 I Live in Behrampada – Madhushree Datta
 1995 Manzar – Gopi Desai
 1996 A Narmada Diary – Anand Patwardhan and Simantini Dhuru
 1997 Beyond the Himalayas – Goutam Ghose

See also
 Filmfare Awards 	 
 Cinema of India

References 

Documentary
Documentary film awards
.